Mirai Ninja may refer to:

Mirai Ninja (film), 1988 Japanese film
Mirai Ninja (video game), 1988 Japanese video game